Petro Zheji (18 October 1929 - 14 March 2015) was an Albanian linguist, translator, philosopher, and author from Gjirokastër who lived and worked intellectually in Tiranë, Albania. As a polyglot, he was deeply knowledgeable in the Italian, French, English, Spanish, German, Russian, Hebrew, Sanskrit, Ancient Greek, and Latin languages. The Albanologist Elsie considers him "the spiritual father to a whole generation of Albanian intellectuals".

Life
Zheji was born in Tirana, Albania, in a family originating from the Zhej village of Zagori. He was the son of Spiro Ballo Zheji, and brother of the other notable Albanian translator Gjergj Zheji. He studied mathematics-physics in a 2-year school in Tirana and afterwards started working as a teacher. Initially at his own high school Qemal Stafa Gymnasium in Tirana, and later in Gjirokastër. Shortly after he registered in the University of Tirana, the Albanian Language branch of the Philology Faculty. For many years he worked as translator for the 8 Nëntori Publishing House and Naim Frashëri Publishing House. He married the Albanian actress Besa Imami, a marriage which lasted 15 years. The couple had one son, Artur Zheji a known journalist and critic in Albania. After the fall of communism in the early 1990s, he settled in the US, but returned in a few years.

Studies on Albanian language
His first study on the Albania language came at the end of the 1970s, but couldn't be published until 2001. The book was titled Shqipja dhe Sankritishtja (Albanian and Sanskrit), a linguistic and logic approach which represented at the same time the first comprehensive and systematic comparison between Albanian and Sanskrit, both seen as an anchor between language and modern languages. The book concentrates on presenting Albanian's key position in etymologizing "en profondeur" not only Sanskrit, but also with languages considered to belong to wholly different language families. The publication saw the light only after the 1990s, and comprises the priceless contribution to Albanological sciences.
The primordial roots of the Albanian language were also covered in his other book Libri i aforizmave (Book of aphorisms) published in 2012.

Publications

Books 
 Shqipja dhe Sanskritishtja (The Albanian and Sanskrit language), Part I,  2001.
 Shqipja dhe Sanskritishtja (The Albanian and Sanskrit language), Part II,  2006.
 Libri i aforizmave (Book of aphorisms), 2012.
 Roli mesianik i shqipes (The messianic role of the Albanian language), 2015.

Translations 
Zheji translated over 30 works into Albanian, some of the best known:
Resurrection by Leo Tolstoy
Oblomov by Ivan Goncharov 
The grapes of wrath  by John Steinbeck
El Señor Presidente and El Papa verde by Miguel Ángel Asturias
The Ingenious Gentleman Don Quixote of La Mancha (second part) by Miguel de Cervantes
The Invisible Man - H. G. Wells
Life of Galileo - Bertolt Brecht
Rameau's Nephew - Diderot
The Sorrows of Young Werther - Goethe

References 

1929 births
2015 deaths
20th-century Albanian philosophers
Qemal Stafa High School alumni
Albanian non-fiction writers
Albanian translators
Russian–Albanian translators
Spanish–Albanian translators
English–Albanian translators
20th-century Albanian writers
21st-century Albanian writers
People from Tirana
French–Albanian translators
German–Albanian translators
Albanian schoolteachers
Eastern Orthodox Christians from Albania
Linguists from Albania
University of Tirana alumni
Albanologists
Members of the Albanian Orthodox Church
20th-century translators
21st-century translators
Albanian male writers
21st-century Albanian philosophers
20th-century male writers
Male non-fiction writers